United Ossetia is a political party in South Ossetia founded in 2012. In the 2014 parliamentary election it won 20 out of 34 seats, clearing the majority in the Parliament of South Ossetia, unseating the Unity Party from power. In the 2019 elections the party lost its majority, while it could not secure a majority with other parties, resulting in a 'hung parliament'.

Leadership  
Between 2012 and 2017 the party was led by Anatoliy Bibilov, a former member of the Unity Party and losing contender in the 2011 presidential elections and current President of South Ossetia since his victory in the 2017 elections. When Bibilov took the presidential office, Alan Tadtaev became party chairman, and after the 2019 elections he was elected as speaker of the parliament.

International relations 
In 2018, representatives of United Ossetia signed a cooperation agreement with the Bosnian Serb ruling party Alliance of Independent Social Democrats.

In 2022, representatives of United Ossetia signed a cooperation agreement with the Russian ruling party United Russia of Vladimir Putin.

External links
Official website

References 

Political parties in South Ossetia